Ambrosi is both a surname and a given name. Notable people with the name include:

 Surname
 Alejandra Ambrosi, Mexican television actress
 Christie Ambrosi (born 1976), American softball player
 Francesco Ambrosi (1821–1897), Italian botanist, librarian ethnologue and historian.
 Gianpaolo Ambrosi (born 1940), Italian luger
 Marco degli Ambrosi, also known as Melozzo da Forlì (c. 1438–1494), Italian Renaissance painter and architect. 
 Paúl Ambrosi (born 1980), Ecuadorian football player
 Václav Bernard Ambrosi, Czech painter

 Given name
 Ambrosi Hoffmann (born 1977), Swiss alpine skier

 Given name, spelling variant
 Ambrose of Georgia (1861–1927), Georgian religious figure and scholar

See also 
 Ambrosi's Cave Salamander
 Ambrosia (disambiguation)
 Ambrosio (disambiguation)
 Ambrosius (disambiguation)

it:Ambrosi